Associação Portuguesa de Desportos, simply known as Portuguesa, is a football team based in São Paulo, Brazil. It was founded on 14 August 1920, and is one of the five biggest clubs of the São Paulo state.

Honours

Major titles
Campeonato Brasileiro Série B: Winners (1)
2011

Campeonato Paulista: Winners (3)
1935

1936

1973

Torneio Rio – São Paulo: Winners (2)
1952

1955

Campeonato Paulista Série A2: Winners (2)
2007

2013

Minor titles
Fita Azul: Winners (3)

Torneio Sócrates: Winners (1)

1–0 Corinthians (18/01/2012)

Other titles
 Taça San Izidro: 1951
 Torneio Quadrangular de Istambul: 1972
Torneio Internacional do Estádio do Canindé (Torneio dos Refletores): 1981
 Torneio Quadrangular de Salvador: 1951
 Torneio de Belo Horizonte: 1951
 Torneio Oswaldo Teixeira Duarte (Goiás): 1971
Taça Governador do Estado de São Paulo: 1976
Taça Estado de São Paulo: 1973
Torneio Início Paulista: 1935, 1947, 1996
Taça Mário Soares: 1987
Taça dos Invictos: 1955, 1974

Youth team honours
Copa São Paulo de Futebol Júnior: 1991, 2002
Campeonato Paulista sub-20: 1990, 2010
Campeonato Paulista sub-15: 2002, 2004

Rankings
Campeonato Brasileiro Série A historical ranking:

Campeonato Brasileiro Série B historical ranking:

Campeonato Paulista appearances: 92
Campeonato Paulista Série A2 appearances: 7
Copa do Brasil appearances: 15
Torneio Rio – São Paulo appearances: 19
Copa CONMEBOL appearances: 1
Copa Sudamericana appearances: 1

Landmarks
1920: Foundation;
1935: APEA's Campeonato Paulista winners;
1936: APEA's Campeonato Paulista winners;
1951: Fita Azul winners;
1952: Torneio Rio – São Paulo winners;
1953: Fita Azul winners;
1954: Fita Azul winners;
1955: Torneio Rio – São Paulo winners;
1973: Campeonato Paulista winners;
1981: Campeonato Brasileiro Série A relegation;
1983: Campeonato Brasileiro Série B promotion;
2002: Campeonato Brasileiro Série A relegation;
2006: Campeonato Paulista relegation;
2006: Campeonato Brasileiro Série B promotion;
2007: Campeonato Paulista Série A2 winners (promotion);
2008: Campeonato Brasileiro Série A relegation;
2011: Campeonato Brasileiro Série B winners (promotion);
2012: Campeonato Paulista relegation;
2013: Campeonato Paulista Série A2 winners (promotion);
2013: Campeonato Brasileiro Série A relegation;
2014: Campeonato Brasileiro Série B relegation;
2015: Campeonato Paulista relegation;
2016: Campeonato Brasileiro Série C relegation;
2017: Campeonato Brasileiro Série D relegation (no division status for the following year).

Notes

References

External links
Official website 
Alma Lusa - History and statistics 

Associação Portuguesa de Desportos
Brazilian football club statistics